Lantmäteriverket may refer too:

National Land Survey of Finland
National Land Survey of Sweden